The longspine bellowfish (Notopogon xenosoma) is a species of fish of the family Centriscidae. It is found in the subtropical belt of the Southern hemisphere, from South Africa to the St. Paul and Amsterdam Islands to New Zealand. Its range extends North as far as Madagascar and New Caledonia. It is found at depths of 100m to 700m. It can grow to lengths of 18 cm.

References

Further reading

WoRMS

xenosoma
Marine fish of New Zealand
Marine fish of Africa
Fish of the Indian Ocean
Fish of the Pacific Ocean